Statistics of the 1997–98 Saudi First Division.

Play-off
The play-off was played over a single leg at a neutral venue.

0–0 on aggregate. Najran won 4–3 on penalties.

External links 
 Saudi Arabia First Division on rsssf.com 
 Saudi Arabia Football Federation
 Saudi League Statistics

Saudi First Division League seasons
Saudi Professional League
2